Eva-Maria Brem (born 13 September 1988) is an Austrian former World Cup alpine ski racer, who specialised in giant slalom.

Born in Schwaz, Tyrol, Brem resides in nearby Münster and made her World Cup debut at age 17 in December 2005 in a slalom at Lienz. She represented Austria at the 2010 Winter Olympics, and finished in seventh place in the giant slalom. Brem attained her first two World Cup podiums in March 2014 and first victory that November, all in giant slalom.

World Cup results

Season titles
 1 title – (1 Giant slalom)

Season standings

Standings through 10 April 2021

Race podiums
 3 wins – (3 GS)
 11 podiums – (11 GS)

World Championship results

Olympic results

References

External links

 
 Eva-Marie Brem World Cup standings at the International Ski Federation
 
 
 
 Eva-Marie Brem at Austrian Ski team (ÖSV) official site 
Eva-Marie Brem at Völkl Skis
  

1988 births
Austrian female alpine skiers
Alpine skiers at the 2010 Winter Olympics
Olympic alpine skiers of Austria
Living people
People from Schwaz
Sportspeople from Tyrol (state)
20th-century Austrian women
21st-century Austrian women